Mount Edgecumbe is a mountain in the Fiordland National Park in the Southland Region of New Zealand. It is situated on the southern side of Cook Channel, an arm of Dusky Sound and is the westernmost of a small mountain range containing several higher but unnamed peaks. There is a small unnamed lake at around 800 metres on the southeastern flank of the mountain.

References

Mountains of Fiordland
Edgecumbe